Agdistis karakalensis is a moth in the family Pterophoridae. It is known from Iran, Turkmenistan and Tajikistan.

References

External links
Новые виды молевидных чешуекрылых (Lepidoptera: Tineidae, Incurvariidae, Brachodidae, Pterophoridae) фауны СССР

Moths described in 1990
Agdistinae
Moths of the Middle East